Hullappa Yamanappa Meti is an Indian politician. He is a member of Indian National Congress, a member of the 14th Karnataka Legislative Assembly, and a former minister in the Siddaramaiah cabinet. In the 2013 Karnataka Legislative Assembly election, Meti was elected from the Bagalkot assembly constituency, polling 68,216 votes. In the 2018 Karnataka Legislative Assembly election, he lost to Veerabhadrayya Charantimath of BJP, by a margin of 15,934 votes.

Scandal 
Meti was appointed Excise Minister, but after a CD was published showing him engaging in a sexual act, he resigned on 7 December 2016.

On 11 December 2016, a woman in a televised interview accused Meti of having sought sexual favours in return for a transfer, but said she was not the woman in the sex video.

On 12 December, RTI activist Rajashekar Mulali complained to the police of receiving death threats from the minister and his followers for saying he had a sex CD on him. Meti described it as a political conspiracy to malign him, claiming he was not involved in any immoral act with any woman, and challenged Mulali to release the tape.

The original video was reported missing during the investigation. On 24 May 2017, the Criminal Investigation Department (CID) of the Karnataka Police, which investigated the case gave him "clean chit" and reported that the video was doctored.

On 18 August 2017, a woman claiming that she was the one in the sex video filed a complaint of kidnapping and rape against Meti.

References

External links 
H. Y. Meti affidavit
http://www.indiapress.org/election/archives/lok11/biodata/11kn01.php

Karnataka MLAs 2013–2018
Karnataka politicians
1946 births
Living people
India MPs 1996–1997